A constitutional referendum was held in Anguilla on 6 February 1969. Following the 1967 uprising on the island, which had seen the local police force expelled, and a referendum on separation, British troops had taken over Anguilla, before leaving in January 1968. On 8 January 1969 Ronald Webster declared independence. A republican constitution was put forward and approved by 99.71% of voters. After the referendum, British troops returned to occupy the island on 19 March.

Webster later proposed a referendum with three options; independence, association with the UK or remaining in the Saint Christopher-Nevis-Anguilla federation. Option two was later introduced without a vote, and Anguilla was administered separately from 1971, before being officially separated from Saint Kitts and Nevis in 1980.

Results

References

Anguilla
Referendums in Anguilla
1969 in Saint Kitts-Nevis-Anguilla
Constitutional referendums
February 1969 events in North America